Marion Robert Morrison (May 26, 1907 – June 11, 1979), professionally known as John Wayne and nicknamed The Duke or Duke Wayne, was an American actor who became a popular icon through his starring roles in films which were produced during Hollywood's Golden Age, especially through his starring roles in Western and war movies. His career flourished from the silent era of the 1920s through the American New Wave, as he appeared in a total of 179 film and television productions. He was among the top box-office draws for three decades, and he appeared with many other important Hollywood stars of his era. In 1999, the American Film Institute selected Wayne as one of the greatest male stars of classic American cinema.

Wayne was born in Winterset, Iowa, but he grew up in Southern California. After losing his football scholarship to the University of Southern California from a bodysurfing accident, he began working for the Fox Film Corporation. He appeared mostly in small parts, but his first leading role came in Raoul Walsh's Western The Big Trail (1930), an early widescreen film epic that was a box-office failure. He played leading roles in numerous  during the 1930s, most of them also Westerns, without becoming a major name. John Ford's Stagecoach (1939) made Wayne a mainstream star, and he starred in 142 motion pictures altogether. According to one biographer, "John Wayne personified for millions the nation's frontier heritage."

Wayne's other roles in Westerns include a cattleman driving his herd on the Chisholm Trail in Red River (1948), a Civil War veteran whose niece is abducted by a tribe of Comanches in The Searchers (1956), a troubled rancher competing with a lawyer (James Stewart) for a woman's hand in The Man Who Shot Liberty Valance (1962), and a cantankerous one-eyed marshal in True Grit (1969), for which he received the Academy Award for Best Actor. He is also remembered for his roles in The Quiet Man (1952) with Maureen O'Hara, Rio Bravo (1959) with Dean Martin, and The Longest Day (1962). In his final screen performance, he starred as an aging gunfighter battling cancer in The Shootist (1976). He made his last public appearance at the Academy Awards ceremony on April 9, 1979, and died of stomach cancer two months later. In 1980, he was posthumously awarded the Presidential Medal of Freedom, the highest civilian honor of the United States.

Early life

Wayne was born Marion Robert Morrison on May 26, 1907, at 224 South Second Street in Winterset, Iowa. The local paper, Winterset Madisonian, reported on page 4 of the edition of May 30, 1907, that Wayne weighed 13 lb (around 6 kg) at birth. Wayne claimed his middle name was soon changed from Robert to Michael when his parents decided to name their next son Robert, but extensive research has found no such legal change, although it might have been changed informally or the documention may have been lost. Wayne's legal name apparently remained Marion Robert Morrison his entire life although to this day his original name is almost always referred to as Marion Michael Morrison. 

Wayne's father, Clyde Leonard Morrison (1884–1937), was the son of American Civil War veteran Marion Mitchell Morrison (1845–1915). Wayne's mother, the former Mary "Molly" Alberta Brown (1885–1970), was from Lancaster County, Nebraska. Wayne had Scottish,  Scotch-Irish, English, and Irish ancestry. His great-great-grandfather Robert Morrison (b. 1782) left County Antrim, Ireland, with his mother, arriving in New York in 1799 and eventually settling in Adams County, Ohio. The Morrisons were originally from the Isle of Lewis in the Outer Hebrides, Scotland. He was raised Presbyterian.

Wayne's family moved to Palmdale, California, and then in 1916 to Glendale at 404 Isabel Street, where his father worked as a pharmacist. He attended Glendale Union High School, where he performed well in both sports and academics. Wayne was part of his high school's football team and its debating team. He was also the president of the Latin Society and contributed to the school's newspaper sports column.

A local fireman at the station on his route to school in Glendale started calling him "Little Duke" because he never went anywhere without his huge Airedale Terrier, Duke. He preferred "Duke" to "Marion", and the nickname stuck. Wayne attended Wilson Middle School in Glendale. As a teen, he worked in an ice-cream shop for a man who shod horses for Hollywood studios. He was also active as a member of the Order of DeMolay. He played football for the 1924 league champion Glendale High School team.

Wayne applied to the U.S. Naval Academy, but was not accepted due to poor grades. Instead, he attended the University of Southern California (USC), majoring in pre-law. He was a member of the Trojan Knights and Sigma Chi fraternities. A broken collarbone injury curtailed his athletic career; Wayne later noted that he was too terrified of Jones' reaction to reveal the actual cause of his injury, a bodysurfing accident. He lost his athletic scholarship, and without funds, had to leave the university.

Career

Early works and first lead role 
As a favor to coach Jones, who had given silent Western film star Tom Mix tickets to USC games, director John Ford and Mix hired Wayne as a prop boy and extra. Wayne later credited his walk, talk, and persona to his acquaintance with Wyatt Earp, who was good friends with Tom Mix. Wayne soon moved to bit parts, establishing a longtime friendship with the director who provided most of those roles, John Ford. Early in this period, he had a minor, uncredited role as a guard in the 1926 film Bardelys the Magnificent. Wayne also appeared with his USC teammates playing football in Brown of Harvard (1926), The Dropkick (1927), and Salute (1929) and Columbia's Maker of Men (filmed in 1930, released in 1931).While working for Fox Film Corporation in bit roles, Wayne was given on-screen credit as "Duke Morrison" only once, in Words and Music (1929). Director Raoul Walsh saw him moving studio furniture while working as a prop boy and cast him in his first starring role in The Big Trail (1930). For his screen name, Walsh suggested "Anthony Wayne", after Revolutionary War General "Mad" Anthony Wayne. Fox Studios chief Winfield Sheehan rejected it as sounding "too Italian". Walsh then suggested "John Wayne". Sheehan agreed, and the name was set. Wayne was not even present for the discussion. His pay was raised to $105 a week.

The Big Trail was to be the first big-budget outdoor spectacle of the sound era, made at a then-staggering cost over $2 million (over $32.8 million equivalent in 2021), using hundreds of extras and wide vistas of the American Southwest, still largely unpopulated at the time. To take advantage of the breathtaking scenery, it was filmed in two versions, a standard 35 mm version and another in the new 70 mm Grandeur film process, using an innovative camera and lenses. Many in the audience who saw it in Grandeur stood and cheered, but only a handful of theaters were equipped to show the film in its widescreen process, and the effort was largely wasted at the time. The film was considered a huge box-office flop at the time, but came to be highly regarded by modern critics.

Subsequent films, breakthrough, and war years 

After the commercial failure of The Big Trail, Wayne was relegated to small roles in A pictures, including Columbia's The Deceiver (1931), in which he played a corpse. He appeared in the serial The Three Musketeers (1933), an updated version of the Alexandre Dumas novel in which the protagonists were soldiers in the French Foreign Legion in then-contemporary North Africa. He played the lead, with his name over the title, in many low-budget Poverty Row Westerns, mostly at Monogram Pictures and serials for Mascot Pictures Corporation. By Wayne's own estimation, he appeared in about 80 of these horse operas from 1930 to 1939. In Riders of Destiny (1933), he became one of the first singing cowboys of film, albeit via dubbing. Wayne also appeared in some of the Three Mesquiteers Westerns, whose title was a play on the Dumas classic. He was mentored by stuntmen in riding and other Western skills. Stuntman Yakima Canutt and Wayne developed and perfected stunts and onscreen fisticuffs techniques that are still in use. One of the main innovations with which Wayne is credited in these early Poverty Row Westerns is allowing the good guys to fight as convincingly as the bad guys, by not always making them fight clean. Wayne claimed, "Before I came along, it was standard practice that the hero must always fight clean. The heavy was allowed to hit the hero in the head with a chair or throw a kerosene lamp at him or kick him in the stomach, but the hero could only knock the villain down politely and then wait until he rose. I changed all that. I threw chairs and lamps. I fought hard and I fought dirty. I fought to win."

Wayne's second breakthrough role came with John Ford's Stagecoach (1939). Because of Wayne's B-movie status and track record in low-budget Westerns throughout the 1930s, Ford had difficulty getting financing for what was to be an A-budget film. After rejection by all the major studios, Ford struck a deal with independent producer Walter Wanger in which Claire Trevor—a much bigger star at the time—received top billing. Stagecoach was a huge critical and financial success, and Wayne became a mainstream star. Cast member Louise Platt credited Ford as saying at the time that Wayne would become the biggest star ever because of his appeal as the archetypal "everyman".

America's entry into World War II resulted in a deluge of support for the war effort from all sectors of society, and Hollywood was no exception. Wayne was exempted from service due to his age (34 at the time of Pearl Harbor) and family status (classified as 3-A – family deferment). Wayne repeatedly wrote to John Ford saying he wanted to enlist, on one occasion inquiring whether he could get into Ford's military unit. Wayne did not attempt to prevent his reclassification as 1-A (draft eligible), but Republic Studios was emphatically resistant to losing him, since he was their only A-list actor under contract. Herbert J. Yates, president of Republic, threatened Wayne with a lawsuit if he walked away from his contract, and Republic Pictures intervened in the Selective Service process, requesting Wayne's further deferment.

U.S. National Archives records indicate that Wayne, in fact, did make an application to serve in the Office of Strategic Services (OSS), precursor to the modern CIA, but his bid was ultimately unsuccessful. Wayne toured U.S. bases and hospitals in the South Pacific for three months in 1943 and 1944, with the USO. During this trip, he carried out a request from William J. Donovan, head of the OSS, to assess whether General Douglas MacArthur, commander of the South West Pacific Area, or his staff were hindering the work of the OSS. Donovan later issued Wayne an OSS Certificate of Service to memorialize Wayne's contribution to the OSS mission.

By many accounts, his failure to serve in the military later became the most painful part of his life. His widow later suggested that his patriotism in later decades sprang from guilt, writing: "He would become a 'superpatriot' for the rest of his life trying to atone for staying home."

Wayne's first color film was Shepherd of the Hills (1941), in which he co-starred with his longtime friend Harry Carey. The following year, he appeared in his only film directed by Cecil B. DeMille, the Technicolor epic Reap the Wild Wind (1942), in which he co-starred with Ray Milland and Paulette Goddard; it was one of the rare times he played a character with questionable values.

Like most Hollywood stars of his era, Wayne appeared as a guest on radio programs, such as: The Hedda Hopper Show and The Louella Parsons Show. He made a number of appearances in dramatic roles, mainly recreations for radio of his own film roles, on such programs as Screen Directors Playhouse and Lux Radio Theatre. For six months in 1942, Wayne starred in his own radio adventure series, Three Sheets to the Wind, produced by film director Tay Garnett. In the series, an international spy/detective show, Wayne played Dan O'Brien, a detective who used alcoholism as a mask for his investigatory endeavors. The show was intended by Garnett to be a pilot of sorts for a film version, though the motion picture never came to fruition. No episodes of the series featuring Wayne seem to have survived, though a demonstration episode with Brian Donlevy in the leading role does exist. Wayne, not Donlevy, played the role throughout the series' run on NBC.
Director Robert Rossen offered the starring role in All the King's Men (1949) to Wayne, but he refused, believing the script to be un-American in many ways. Broderick Crawford, who was eventually cast in the role, won the 1949 Oscar for best male actor, ironically beating out Wayne, who had been nominated for Sands of Iwo Jima (1949).

1950s 
He lost the leading role of Jimmy Ringo in The Gunfighter (1950) to Gregory Peck due to his refusal to work for Columbia Pictures because its chief, Harry Cohn, had mistreated him years before when he was a young contract player. Cohn had bought the project for Wayne, but Wayne's grudge was too deep, and Cohn sold the script to Twentieth Century Fox, which cast Peck in the role Wayne badly wanted, but for which he refused to bend.

Batjac, the production company co-founded by Wayne in 1952, was named after the fictional shipping company Batjak in Wake of the Red Witch (1948), a film based on the novel by Garland Roark. (A spelling error by Wayne's secretary was allowed to stand, accounting for the variation.) Batjac (and its predecessor, Wayne-Fellows Productions) was the arm through which Wayne produced many films for himself and other stars. Its best-known non-Wayne productions were Seven Men From Now (1956), which started the classic collaboration between director Budd Boetticher and star Randolph Scott, and Gun the Man Down (1956) with contract player James Arness as an outlaw.

One of Wayne's most popular roles was in The High and the Mighty (1954), directed by William Wellman, and based on a novel by Ernest K. Gann. His portrayal of a heroic copilot won widespread acclaim. Wayne also portrayed aviators in Flying Tigers (1942), Flying Leathernecks (1951), Island in the Sky (1953), The Wings of Eagles (1957), and Jet Pilot (1957).

He appeared in nearly two dozen of John Ford's films over 20 years, including She Wore a Yellow Ribbon (1949), The Quiet Man (1952), The Wings of Eagles (1957). The first movie in which he called someone "Pilgrim", Ford's The Searchers (1956), is often considered to contain Wayne's finest and most complex performance.

On May 14, 1958, Hal Kanter's I Married a Woman starring George Gobel and Diana Dors had its Los Angeles opening. In it, Wayne had a cameo as himself. On October 2, John Huston's The Barbarian and the Geisha, in which Wayne played the lead and clashed with his director all the way, had its New York opening.

Howard Hawks's Rio Bravo premiered on March 18, 1959. In it, Wayne plays the lead with a supporting cast including Dean Martin, Ricky Nelson, Angie Dickinson, Walter Brennan and Ward Bond. John Ford's The Horse Soldiers had its world premiere in Shreveport, Louisiana on June 18. Set during the Civil War, Wayne shares the lead with William Holden.

Wayne notoriously portrayed Genghis Khan in The Conqueror (1956), which was panned by critics.

1960s 

In 1960, Wayne directed and produced The Alamo portraying Davy Crockett, with Richard Widmark as Jim Bowie. Wayne was nominated for an Oscar as the producer in the Best Picture category. That year Wayne also played the lead in Henry Hathaway's North to Alaska also starring Stewart Granger and Ernie Kovacs. In 1961, Wayne shared the lead with Stuart Whitman in Michael Curtiz's The Comancheros.

On May 23, 1962, Wayne starred in John Ford's The Man Who Shot Liberty Valance with James Stewart. May 29 marked the premiere of Howard Hawks's Hatari!, shot on location in Africa with Wayne playing the lead capturing wild animals from the beds of trucks; all the scenes with animals in the film are real. On October 4, The Longest Day started its theatrical run, with Wayne memorably acting with an ensemble cast. Although the other top-level actors in the film accepted a token payment of only $10,000 each to play their roles, making the all-star cast feasible for the budget, Wayne was paid a quarter of a million dollars due to an earlier dispute with producer Darryl F. Zanuck. During this time, the cast of the television drama, Combat!, were preparing for the inaugural season. The principal cast (including Vic Morrow) were to go through a week of basic training at the Army's Infantry Training Center at Fort Ord in northern California. Morrow noted that the instructors who worked with the cast at Fort Ord had one common request: not to act like John Wayne. "Poor John," Morrow told a reporter. "I wonder if he knows he's almost a dirty word in the Army."

On February 20, 1963, Wayne acted in a segment of How the West Was Won directed by John Ford. On June 12, Wayne played the lead in his final John Ford film, Donovan's Reef, co-starring Lee Marvin. On November 13, another film starring Wayne premiered, Andrew V. McLaglen's McLintock!,  once again opposite Maureen O'Hara.

In 1964, Wayne played the leading role in Henry Hathaway's Circus World with Claudia Cardinale and Rita Hayworth.

On February 15, 1965, Wayne played the brief cameo role of a centurion in George Stevens's The Greatest Story Ever Told. On April 6, he shared the screen with Kirk Douglas and Patricia Neal in Otto Preminger's In Harm's Way. On June 13, he acted in Henry Hathaway's The Sons of Katie Elder with Dean Martin.

In 1966, Wayne appeared in a cameo role for Melville Shavelson's Cast a Giant Shadow starring Kirk Douglas.

On May 24, 1967, Wayne played the lead in Burt Kennedy's The War Wagon with Kirk Douglas as the second lead. His second movie that year, Howard Hawks's El Dorado, a highly successful partial remake of Rio Bravo with Robert Mitchum playing Dean Martin's original role, premiered on June 7.

In 1968, Wayne co-directed with Ray Kellogg The Green Berets. the only major film made during the Vietnam War in support of the war. Wayne wanted to make this movie because at that time Hollywood had little interest in making movies about the Vietnam War. During the filming of The Green Berets, the Degar or Montagnard people of Vietnam's Central Highlands, fierce fighters against communism, bestowed on Wayne a brass bracelet that he wore in the film and all subsequent films. Also that year, Wayne played the lead in Andrew V. McLaglen's Hellfighters, a film about the crews who put out oil rig fires. Katharine Ross played a supporting role.

On June 13, 1969, Henry Hathaway's True Grit premiered. For his role as Rooster Cogburn, Wayne won the Best Actor Oscar at the Academy Awards. In November of that year another film starring Wayne was released, Andrew V. McLaglen's The Undefeated with Rock Hudson.

1970s: later career 

On June 24, 1970, Andrew V. McLaglen's Chisum started to play in cinemas. Wayne took the role of the owner of a cattle ranch, who finds out that a businessman is trying to own neighboring land illegally. On September 16, Howard Hawks' Rio Lobo premiered. Wayne played Col. Cord McNally, who confronts Confederate soldiers who stole a shipment of gold at the end of the Civil War. This was another remake of Rio Bravo albeit without a second lead the box office calibre of Dean Martin or Robert Mitchum.

In June 1971, George Sherman's Big Jake made its debut. Wayne played the role of an estranged father who must track down a gang who kidnapped his grandson. The film was a critically acclaimed hit.

In 1972, Wayne starred in Mark Rydell's The Cowboys. Vincent Canby of The New York Times, who did not particularly care for the film, wrote: "Wayne is, of course, marvelously indestructible, and he has become an almost perfect father figure". The same year, he was selected in the last round of the NFL Draft by the Atlanta Falcons for his past football experience, though the pick was disallowed by league officials as he was 64 years old at the time.

On February 7, 1973, Burt Kennedy's The Train Robbers opened; Wayne appeared alongside Ann-Margret, Rod Taylor and Ben Johnson. On June 27, Andrew V. McLaglen's Cahill U.S. Marshal premiered, with Wayne, George Kennedy and Gary Grimes. It was a box office failure.

In 1974, Wayne took on the role of the eponymous detective in John Sturges's crime drama McQ.

On March 25, 1975, Douglas Hickox's Brannigan premiered. In it, Wayne played a Chicago police lieutenant named Jim Brannigan on the hunt in London for an organized-crime leader. On October 17, Rooster Cogburn started its theatrical run; Wayne reprised his role as U.S. Marshal Reuben J. "Rooster" Cogburn with strong elements of the plot of The African Queen along with Katharine Hepburn as his leading lady.

In 1976, Wayne starred in Don Siegel's The Shootist, also starring Lauren Bacall, Ron Howard and James Stewart. It was Wayne's final cinematic role, whose main character, J. B. Books, was dying of cancer, to which Wayne himself succumbed  three years later. It contains numerous plot similarities to The Gunfighter of nearly 30 years before, a role which Wayne had wanted, but turned down. Upon its theatrical release, it grossed $13,406,138 domestically. About $6 million were earned as US theatrical rentals. The film received positive reviews.  It was named one of the Ten Best Films of 1976 by the National Board of Review. Film critic Roger Ebert of the Chicago Sun-Times ranked The Shootist number 10 on his list of the 10 best films of 1976. The film was nominated for an Oscar, a Golden Globe, a BAFTA film award, and a Writers Guild of America award.

Death 
Although he enrolled in a cancer vaccine study in an attempt to ward off the disease, Wayne died of stomach cancer on June 11, 1979, at the UCLA Medical Center. He was buried in the Pacific View Memorial Park Cemetery in Corona del Mar, Newport Beach. According to his son Patrick and his grandson Matthew Muñoz, who was a priest in the California Diocese of Orange, Wayne converted to Roman Catholicism shortly before his death. He requested that his tombstone read "Feo, Fuerte y Formal", a Spanish epitaph Wayne described as meaning "ugly, strong, and dignified". His grave, which was unmarked for 20 years, has been marked since 1999 with the quotation:

Political views

Throughout most of his life, Wayne was a vocally prominent conservative Republican in Hollywood, supporting anti-communist positions. However, he voted for Democratic President Franklin D. Roosevelt in the 1936 presidential election and expressed admiration for Roosevelt's successor, fellow Democratic President Harry S. Truman, despite having supported Republican candidate Thomas E. Dewey in 1948. He took part in creating the conservative Motion Picture Alliance for the Preservation of American Ideals in February 1944 before being elected its president in 1949. An ardent anti-communist and vocal supporter of the House Un-American Activities Committee, he made Big Jim McLain (1952) with himself as a HUAC investigator to demonstrate his support for the cause of anti-communism. His personal views found expression as a proactive inside enforcer of the "Black List", denying employment and undermining careers of many actors and writers who had expressed their personal political beliefs earlier in life. Soviet leader Joseph Stalin is alleged to have said that Wayne should be assassinated for his frequently espoused anti-communist politics, despite being a fan of his movies. Wayne was a supporter of Senator Joseph McCarthy.

Wayne supported Vice President Richard Nixon in the presidential election of 1960, but expressed his vision of patriotism when John F. Kennedy won the election: "I didn't vote for him, but he's my president, and I hope he does a good job." He used his star power to support conservative causes, including rallying support for the Vietnam War by producing, co-directing, and starring in the financially successful film The Green Berets (1968). In 1960, he joined the anti-communist John Birch Society, but quit after the organization denounced fluoridation of water supplies as a communist plot. In 1964, Wayne was a staunch supporter of Barry Goldwater, and actively campaigned for him.

Due to his status as the highest-profile Republican star in Hollywood, wealthy Texas Republican Party backers asked Wayne to run for national office in 1968, like his friend and fellow actor Senator George Murphy. He declined, joking that he did not believe the public would seriously consider an actor in the White House. Instead, he supported his friend Ronald Reagan's campaigns for Governor of California in 1966 and 1970. He was asked to be the running mate for Democratic Alabama Governor George Wallace, who had been nominated for president by the American Independent Party, in his 1968 campaign, but he immediately rejected the offer and actively campaigned for Richard Nixon; Wayne addressed the 1968 Republican National Convention on its opening day.

In 1971, Wayne wrote to President Richard Nixon, who was a friend, to oppose Nixon's planned trip to China. Wayne enclosed some hate literature on "that Jew, Kissinger," who had negotiated the historic meeting with Chinese leaders.

Wayne openly differed with many conservatives over the issue of returning the Panama Canal, as he supported the Panama Canal Treaty in the mid-1970s; while Republican leaders such as Reagan, Jesse Helms, and Strom Thurmond had wanted the U.S. to retain full control of the canal, Wayne and fellow conservative William F. Buckley believed that the Panamanians had the right to the canal and sided with President Jimmy Carter. Wayne was a close friend of Panamanian leader Omar Torrijos Herrera, and Wayne's first wife Josephine was a native of Panama. His support of the treaty brought him hate mail for the first time in his life.

In 1973 actor Marlon Brando refused an Oscar he had won, due to "the treatment of American Indians today by the film industry"; Brando did not attend the award ceremony but asked Native American civil rights activist Sacheen Littlefeather to attend and deliver a refusal speech in the event that he won. Wayne, who has been described as "serial slaughterer of Native Americans on-screen and self-professed white supremacist off it", was in the wings, and was so angry about her presence there that Littlefeather said "he was coming towards me to forcibly take me off the stage, and he had to be restrained by six security men to prevent him from doing so."  However, an investigation in 2022 found that this is unlikely to have happened, and Littlefeather had no way of witnessing this take place.

Roger Ebert writes that Wayne had a sense of humor about his politics. He recalls Wayne giving him a tour of his house: "He pointed out autographed photos of Eisenhower, Nixon, Goldwater, and J. Edgar Hoover. I said I had to take a pee. On the wall of the bathroom opening off the den, he had a photo of Hubert Humphrey, inscribed 'with warm appreciation for your continued Support.'"

Left-wing activist Abbie Hoffman paid tribute to Wayne's singularity, saying, "I like Wayne's wholeness, his style. As for his politics, well—I suppose even cavemen felt a little admiration for the dinosaurs that were trying to gobble them up."

1971 Playboy interview

In May 1971, Playboy magazine published an interview with Wayne, in which he expressed his support for the Vietnam War, and made headlines for his opinions about social issues and race relations in the United States:

In the same Playboy interview, Wayne calls the two lead characters in Midnight Cowboy "fags" for the alleged "love of those two men". He also responded to questions about whether social programs were good for the country:

In February 2019, the Playboy interview resurfaced, which resulted in calls for John Wayne Airport to be renamed. John Wayne's son, Ethan, defended him, stating, "It would be an injustice to judge someone based on an interview that's being used out of context." The calls for changing the airport's name back to Orange County Airport were renewed during the George Floyd protests in June 2020.

In October 2019, USC student activists called for removing an exhibit dedicated to Wayne, citing the interview. In July 2020, it was announced that the exhibit would be removed.

Personal life
Wayne was married three times and divorced twice. His three wives included one of Spanish American descent, Josephine Alicia Saenz, and two from Latin America, Esperanza Baur and Pilar Pallete. He had four children with Josephine: Michael Wayne (November 23, 1934April 2, 2003), Mary Antonia "Toni" Wayne LaCava (February 25, 1936December 6, 2000), Patrick Wayne (born July 15, 1939), and Melinda Wayne Munoz (December 3, 1940April 13, 2022). He had three more children with Pilar: Aissa Wayne (born March 31, 1956), John Ethan Wayne (born February 22, 1962), and Marisa Wayne (born February 22, 1966).

 Several of Wayne's children entered the film and television industry. Son Ethan was billed as John Ethan Wayne in a few films, and played one of the leads in the 1990s update of the Adam-12 television series.  Ethan has also appeared on the History Channel show Pawn Stars to help authenticate merchandise supposedly related to his father's career. Granddaughter Jennifer Wayne, daughter of Aissa, is a member of the country music group Runaway June.

 In 1973, Wayne was encouraged by Pilar, an avid tennis player, to build the John Wayne Tennis Club in Newport Beach, California. In 1995, the club was sold to Ken Stuart, former general manager, and became the Palisades Tennis Club. In The Quiet Man (1952), Wayne tells Michaeleen "Óge" Flynn (portrayed by Barry Fitzgerald) that he is six feet "four and a half" (194 cm), an assertion corroborated by Pilar's book John Wayne: My Life With the Duke.

His divorce from Esperanza Baur, a Mexican former actress, was stormy. She believed that Wayne and co-star Gail Russell were having an affair, a claim that both Wayne and Russell denied. The night the film Angel and the Badman (1947) wrapped, the usual party was held for cast and crew, and Wayne came home very late. Esperanza was in a drunken rage by the time he arrived, and she attempted to shoot him as he walked through the front door.

Wayne had several high-profile affairs, including one with Merle Oberon that lasted from 1938 to 1947. After his separation from Pilar, in 1973, Wayne became romantically involved and lived with his former secretary Pat Stacy (1941–1995) until his death in 1979. Stacy published a book about her life with him in 1983, titled Duke: A Love Story.

Wayne's hair began to thin in the 1940s, and he had begun to wear a hairpiece by the end of the decade. He was occasionally seen in public without the hairpiece (such as, according to Life, at Gary Cooper's funeral). During an appearance at Harvard University, Wayne was asked by a student, "Is it true that your toupée is real hair?" He responded: "Well sir, that's real hair. Not mine, but real hair."

A close friend, California Congressman Alphonzo E. Bell Jr., wrote of Wayne: "Duke's personality and sense of humor were very close to what the general public saw on the big screen. It is perhaps best shown in these words he had engraved on a plaque: 'Each of us is a mixture of some good and some not so good qualities. In considering one's fellow man, it's important to remember the good things. ... We should refrain from making judgments just because a fella happens to be a dirty, rotten S.O.B.'"

Wayne was fond of literature, his favorite authors being Charles Dickens, Arthur Conan Doyle, and Agatha Christie. His favorite books were David Copperfield, and Conan Doyle's historical novels The White Company and Sir Nigel.

Wayne was a chess player. Roger Ebert recalls that on the set of Chisum, "we were playing a chess game, both of us bending over the board on an upended apple crate. Wayne, slouched in his old stitched leather director's chair, had a crowd of kibitzers: wranglers, extras, old cronies, drinking buddies, a couple of Mexican stuntmen. He studied the board, roared with laughter, and said, 'God...damn it! You've trapped my queen!' We studied the board. I made a decisive move. 'Why the hell did I just say that?' he asked. If I hadn't-a...said it, you wouldn't-a...seen it.'" According to Michael Munn, when Wayne was asked about Rock Hudson's sexuality, he replied, "Who the hell cares if he's a queer? The man plays great chess."

He used the same 1873 Colt Single Action Army revolver in many of the Westerns in which he appeared.

Wayne biographer Michael Munn chronicled Wayne's drinking habits. According to Sam O'Steen's memoir, Cut to the Chase, studio directors knew to shoot Wayne's scenes before noon, because by afternoon, he "was a mean drunk". He had been a chain smoker of cigarettes since young adulthood and was diagnosed with lung cancer in 1964. He underwent successful surgery to remove his entire left lung and two ribs. Despite efforts by his business associates to prevent him from going public with his illness for fear that it would cost him work, Wayne announced he had cancer and called on the public to get preventive examinations. Five years later, Wayne was declared cancer-free. Wayne has been credited with coining the term "the Big C" as a euphemism for cancer. Ebert quotes him as saying: "Tequila makes your head hurt. Not from your hangover. From falling over and hitting your head."

He was a Freemason, a Master Mason in Marion McDaniel Lodge No. 56 F&AM, in Tucson, Arizona. He became a 32nd Degree Scottish Rite Mason and later joined the Al Malaikah Shrine Temple in Los Angeles. He became a member of the York Rite. During the early 1960s, Wayne traveled often to Panama, and he purchased the island of Taborcillo off that nation's Pacific coast. It was sold by his estate at his death.

Wayne's yacht, the Wild Goose, was one of his favorite possessions. He kept it docked in Newport Beach Harbor, and it was listed on the U.S. National Register of Historic Places in 2011.

Acting style

In 1974, film critic Charles Champlin wrote of Wayne: "Wayne is a motion picture actor, first, last and always, who defined as powerfully as anyone else what that means. From the lean and intense early days, in those low-cost dusters which still play on morning television, Wayne has had a presence which got through the lenses and shutters and onto the film undiminished." John Ford said of him: "He's not something out of a book, governed by acting rules. He portrays John Wayne, a rugged American guy. He's not one of those method actors, like they send out here from drama schools in New York. He's real, perfectly natural." Lee Strasberg observed that Wayne was similar to fellow actors Spencer Tracy and Gary Cooper, who "try not to act but be themselves".

Wayne thought of himself as a reactor rather than an actor, and felt that the difference between good and bad acting was in acting and reacting. He explained this difference: "In a bad picture, you see them acting all over the place. In a good picture, they react in a logical way to a situation they're in, so the audience can identify with the actors." When asked about his approach to acting, Wayne commented: "I read dramatic lines undramatically and react to situations normally. This is not as simple as it sounds. I've spent a major portion of my life trying to do it well and I am not past learning it yet." Much like many actors of his generation, Wayne disliked method acting, and once said of them: "Let those actors who picked their noses get all the dialogue, just give me the close-up of reaction."

Howard Hawks, who directed him in five films, felt that after losing one of his lungs, Wayne became a much better actor. Hawks explained: "Because of the lung Wayne lost, he reads his lines differently. He pauses in the strangest places simply because he hasn't got the breath he used to have. This device is terribly effective, because you keep your eyes on him and wait for him to finish, because you don't know what's coming next." Raoul Walsh noted: "Wayne underacts, and it's mighty effective, not because he tries to underact–it's a hard thing to do if you try–but because he can't overact."

Despite his popularity at the box office, Wayne was often criticized for playing the same type of character during most of his career. In a 1969 interview with Roger Ebert, Wayne remarked: "Of course, they give me that John Wayne stuff so much, claim I always play the same role. Seems like nobody remembers how different the fellows were in The Quiet Man or Iwo Jima, or Yellow Ribbon, where I was 35 playing a man of 65. To stay a star, you have to bring along some of your own personality. Thousands of good actors can carry a scene, but a star has to carry the scene and still, without intruding, allow some of his character into it."

Legacy

Awards, celebrations, and landmarks

Wayne's enduring status as an iconic American was formally recognized by the U.S. government in the form of the two highest civilian decorations. On his 72nd birthday on May 26, 1979, Wayne was awarded the Congressional Gold Medal. Hollywood figures and American leaders from across the political spectrum, including Maureen O'Hara, Elizabeth Taylor, Frank Sinatra, Mike Frankovich, Katharine Hepburn, General and Mrs. Omar Bradley, Gregory Peck, Robert Stack, James Arness, and Kirk Douglas, testified to Congress in support of the award. Robert Aldrich, president of the Directors Guild of America, made a particularly notable statement:

Wayne was posthumously awarded the Presidential Medal of Freedom on June 9, 1980, by President Jimmy Carter. He had attended Carter's inaugural ball in 1977 "as a member of the loyal opposition", as he described it. In 1998, he was awarded the Naval Heritage Award by the US Navy Memorial Foundation for his support of the Navy and military during his film career. In 1999, the American Film Institute named Wayne 13th among the Greatest Male Screen Legends of classic Hollywood cinema.

In the essay "John Wayne: A Love Song", Joan Didion recalls the first time she saw Wayne in a movie: "it was there, that summer of 1943 while the hot wind blew outside, that I fist saw John Wayne. Saw the walk, heard the voice. Heard him tell the girl in a picture called War of the Wildcats that he would build her a house, 'at the bend in the river where the cottonwoods grow.' As it happened I did not grow up to be kind of woman who is the heroine in a Western, and although the men I have known have had many virtues and have taken me to live in many places I have come to love, they have never been John Wayne, and they have never taken me to that bend in the river where the cottonwoods grow. Deep in that part of my heart where the artificial rain forever falls, that is still the line I want to hear... When John Wayne rode through my childhood, and perhaps through yours, he determined forever the shapes of certain of our dreams. It did not seem possible that such a man could fall ill, could carry within him that most inexplicable and ungovernable of diseases."

Various public locations are named in honor of Wayne, including the John Wayne Airport in Orange County, California, where a  bronze equestrian statue of him stands at the entrance; the John Wayne Marina for which Wayne bequeathed the land, near Sequim, Washington; John Wayne Elementary School (P.S. 380) in Brooklyn, New York, which boasts a  mosaic mural commission by New York artist Knox Martin entitled "John Wayne and the American Frontier"; and over a  named the "John Wayne Pioneer Trail" in Washington's Iron Horse State Park. A larger-than-life-sized bronze statue of Wayne atop a horse was erected at the corner of La Cienega Boulevard and Wilshire Boulevard in Beverly Hills, California, at the former offices of the Great Western Savings and Loan Corporation, for which Wayne had made a number of commercials. In the city of Maricopa, Arizona, part of Arizona State Route 347 is named John Wayne Parkway, which runs through the center of town.

In 2006, friends of Wayne and his former Arizona business partner, Louis Johnson, inaugurated the "Louie and the Duke Classics" events benefiting the John Wayne Cancer Foundation and the American Cancer Society. The weekend-long event each fall in Casa Grande, Arizona, includes a golf tournament, an auction of John Wayne memorabilia, and a team roping competition.

Several celebrations took place on May 26, 2007, the centennial of Wayne's birth. A celebration at the John Wayne birthplace in Winterset, Iowa, included chuck-wagon suppers, concerts by Michael Martin Murphey and Riders in the Sky, a Wild West Revue in the style of Buffalo Bill's Wild West show, and a Cowboy Symposium with Wayne's costars, producers, and costumers. Wayne's films ran repetitively at the local theater. Ground was broken for the new John Wayne Birthplace Museum and Learning Center at a ceremony consisting of over 30 of Wayne's family members, including Melinda Wayne Muñoz, Aissa, Ethan, and Marisa Wayne. Later that year, California Governor Arnold Schwarzenegger and First Lady Maria Shriver inducted Wayne into the California Hall of Fame, located at the California Museum in Sacramento.

In 2016, Republican assemblyman Matthew Harper proposed marking May 26 as "John Wayne Day" in California. This resolution was struck down by a vote of 35 to 20, due to Wayne's views on race and his support of controversial organizations such as the John Birch Society and the House Un-American Activities Committee.

American icon

Wayne rose beyond the typical recognition for a famous actor to that of an enduring icon who symbolized and communicated American values and ideals.   Using the power of communication through silent films and radio, Wayne was instrumental in creating a national culture from disparate areas of the US, and made the creation of a national hero possible. By the middle of his career, Wayne had developed a larger-than-life image, and as his career progressed, he selected roles that would not compromise his off-screen image. Wayne embodied the icon of strong American masculinity and rugged individualism in both his films and his life. At a party in 1957, Wayne confronted actor Kirk Douglas about the latter's decision to play the role of Vincent van Gogh in the film Lust for Life, saying: "Christ, Kirk, how can you play a part like that? There's so goddamn few of us left. We got to play strong, tough characters. Not these weak queers." However, actor Marlon Brando was notably critical of Wayne's public persona and of the cultural insensitivity of Wayne's characters, arguing on The Dick Cavett Show that, "We [Americans] like to see ourselves as perhaps John Wayne sees us. That we are a country that stands for freedom, for rightness, for justice," before adding that "it just simply doesn't apply."

Wayne's rise to being the quintessential movie war hero began to take shape four years after World War II, when Sands of Iwo Jima (1949) was released. His footprints at Grauman's Chinese theater in Hollywood were laid in concrete that contained sand from Iwo Jima. His status grew so large and legendary that when Japanese Emperor Hirohito visited the United States in 1975, he asked to meet John Wayne, the symbolic representation of his country's former enemy. Likewise when Soviet leader Nikita Khrushchev visited the United States in 1959, he made two requests: to visit Disneyland and meet Wayne.

In the Motion Picture Herald Top Ten Money-Making Western Stars poll, Wayne was listed in 1936 and 1939. He appeared in the similar Box Office poll in 1939 and 1940. While these two polls are really an indication only of the popularity of series stars, Wayne also appeared in the Top Ten Money Makers Poll of all films from 1949 to 1957 and 1958 to 1974, taking first place in 1950, 1951, 1954, and 1971. With a total of 25 years on the list, Wayne has more appearances than any other star, surpassing Clint Eastwood (21) who is in second place.

Wayne is the only actor to appear in every edition of the annual Harris Poll of Most Popular Film Actors, and the only actor to appear on the list after his death. Wayne was in the top 10 in this poll for 19 consecutive years, starting in 1994, 15 years after his death.

Mylène Demongeot declared in a 2015 filmed interview: "Gary Cooper was sublime, there I have to say, now he, was part of the stars, Gary Cooper, Cary Grant, John Wayne, those great Americans who I've met really were unbelievable guys, there aren't any like them anymore."

John Wayne Cancer Foundation
The John Wayne Cancer Foundation was founded in 1985 in honor of John Wayne, after his family granted the use of his name (and limited funding) for the continued fight against cancer. The foundation's mission is to "bring courage, strength, and grit to the fight against cancer". The foundation provides funds for innovative programs that improve cancer patient care, including research, education, awareness, and support.

Dispute with Duke University
Newport Beach, California-based John Wayne Enterprises, a business operated by Wayne's heirs, sells products, including Kentucky straight Bourbon, bearing the "Duke" brand and using Wayne's picture. When the company tried to trademark the image appearing on one of the bottles, Duke University in Durham, North Carolina, filed a notice of opposition. According to court documents, Duke has tried three times since 2005 to stop the company from trademarking the name. The company sought a declaration permitting registration of their trademark. The company's complaint filed in federal court said the university did "not own the word 'Duke' in all contexts for all purposes." The university's official position was not to object provided Wayne's image appeared with the name. On September 30, 2014, Orange County, California federal judge David Carter dismissed the company's suit, deciding the plaintiffs had chosen the wrong jurisdiction.

Filmography

Between 1926 and 1977, Wayne appeared in over 170 films. According to Quigley Polling, which has taken place every year since 1932 to find the top box-office stars, John Wayne was named the top money maker (as of 2005).

Missed roles
 Wayne turned down the lead role in the 1952 film High Noon because he felt the film's story was an allegory against blacklisting, which he actively supported. In a 1971 interview, Wayne said he considered High Noon "the most un-American thing I've ever seen in my whole life", and that he would "never regret having helped run screenwriter Carl Foreman [who was later blacklisted] out of the country".
 An urban legend has it that in 1955, Wayne turned down the role of Matt Dillon in the long-running television series Gunsmoke and recommended James Arness, instead. While he did suggest Arness for the part and introduced him in a prologue to the first episode, no film star of Wayne's stature would have considered a television role at the time.
 Terry Southern's biographer Lee Hill wrote that the role of Major T. J. "King" Kong in Dr. Strangelove (1964) was originally written with Wayne in mind, and that Stanley Kubrick offered him the part after Peter Sellers injured his ankle during filming; he immediately turned it down. While Sellers went on to play three other roles in the film, Slim Pickens played Kong.
 In 1966, Wayne accepted the role of Major Reisman in The Dirty Dozen (1967), and asked Metro-Goldwyn-Mayer for some script changes, but eventually withdrew from the project to make The Green Berets. He was replaced by Lee Marvin.
 Though Wayne actively campaigned for the title role in Dirty Harry (1971), Warner Bros. decided that at 63 he was too old, and cast the 41-year-old Clint Eastwood.
 Director Peter Bogdanovich and screenwriter Larry McMurtry pitched a film in 1971 called Streets of Laredo that would co-star Wayne along with James Stewart and Henry Fonda. They conceived it as a Western that would bring the final curtain down on Hollywood Westerns. Stewart and Fonda both agreed to appear in it, but after long consideration, Wayne turned it down, citing his feeling that his character was more underdeveloped and uninteresting than those of his co-stars, which was largely based on John Ford's recommendation after perusing the script. The project was shelved for some 20 years, until McMurtry rewrote and expanded the original screenplay co-written with Bogdanovich to make the novel and subsequent TV miniseries Lonesome Dove, with Tommy Lee Jones in Wayne's role and Robert Duvall playing the part originally written for Stewart in the extremely popular miniseries.
 Mel Brooks offered Wayne the role of the Waco Kid (eventually played by Gene Wilder) in Blazing Saddles (1974). After reading the script, Wayne declined, fearing the dialogue was "too dirty" for his family-friendly image, but told Brooks that he would be "first in line" to see the movie.
 Steven Spielberg offered both Wayne and Charlton Heston the role of Major General Joseph Stilwell in the film 1941 with Wayne also considered for a cameo in it. After reading the script, Wayne decided not to participate due to ill health, but also urged Spielberg not to pursue the project. Both Wayne and Heston felt the film was unpatriotic. Spielberg recalled, "[Wayne] was really curious and so I sent him the script. He called me the next day and said he felt it was a very un-American movie, and I shouldn't waste my time making it. He said, 'You know, that was an important war, and you're making fun of a war that cost thousands of lives at Pearl Harbor. Don't joke about World War II'."

Awards and nominations

Academy Awards

Golden Globe Awards

Grammy Awards

Brass Balls Award
In 1973, The Harvard Lampoon, a satirical paper run by Harvard University students, invited Wayne to receive The Brass Balls Award, created in his "honor", after calling him "the biggest fraud in history". Wayne accepted the invitation as a chance to promote the recently released film McQ, and a Fort Devens Army convoy offered to drive him into Harvard Square on an armored personnel carrier. The ceremony was held on January 15, 1974, at the Harvard Square Theater and the award was officially presented in honor of Wayne's "outstanding machismo and penchant for punching people". Although the convoy was met with protests by members of the American Indian Movement and others, some of whom threw snowballs, Wayne received a standing ovation from the audience when he walked onto the stage. An internal investigation was launched into the Army's involvement in the day.

Additional awards and honors
 1970, Received the DeMolay Legion of Honor
 1970, Received the Golden Plate Award of the American Academy of Achievement
 1973, Awarded the Gold Medal from the National Football Foundation
 1974, Inducted into the Hall of Great Western Performers in the National Cowboy and Western Heritage Museum
 1979, Received the Congressional Gold Medal
 1980, Awarded the Presidential Medal of Freedom, the nation's highest civilian honor, by President Jimmy Carter
 1986, Inducted into the DeMolay Hall of Fame

See also

 Hall of Great Western Performers
 List of film director and actor collaborations
 List of famous amateur chess players
 List of Freemasons
 National Cowboy & Western Heritage Museum
 Red Scare
 John Wayne filmography

References
Footnotes

Citations

Sources

Further reading

 
 
 Calder, Jenni (1979), John Wayne - Man and Myth of the West, in Bold, Christine (ed.), Cencrastus No. 1, Autumn 1979, pp. 13 – 16 
 
 
 
 
 
 
 Jensen, Richard (2012). When the Legend Became Fact – The True Life of John Wayne. Nashville: Raymond Street Publishers, 2012.

External links

 
 John Wayne Cancer Foundation
 John Wayne Cancer Institute
 FBI file on John Wayne
 Birthplace of John Wayne official website
 
 
 
 "On the Set of The Alamo": Behind-the-scenes footage from the production of the film, from the Texas Archive of the Moving Image
 
 

 
1907 births
1979 deaths
20th Century Studios contract players
20th-century American male actors
American anti-communists
American film producers
American football offensive linemen
American male film actors
American male silent film actors
American people of English descent
American people of Irish descent
American people of Scotch-Irish descent
American people of Scottish descent
American Roman Catholics
Articles containing video clips
Best Actor Academy Award winners
Best Drama Actor Golden Globe (film) winners
Burials at Pacific View Memorial Park
California Republicans
Catholics from Iowa
Cecil B. DeMille Award Golden Globe winners
Congressional Gold Medal recipients
Converts to Roman Catholicism from Presbyterianism
Deaths from cancer in California
Deaths from stomach cancer
Film directors from Iowa
Film directors from Los Angeles
Film producers from California
Glendale High School (Glendale, California) alumni
Iowa Republicans
John Birch Society members
Liberty Records artists
Male Western (genre) film actors
Male actors from Glendale, California
Male actors from Iowa
Male actors from Newport Beach, California
Male film serial actors
People from Palmdale, California
People from Winterset, Iowa
Presidential Medal of Freedom recipients
RCA Records artists
USC Trojans football players
University of Southern California alumni
Western (genre) film directors
Universal Pictures contract players
Members of The Lambs Club
United Service Organizations entertainers
American Freemasons